Hsing Yun (19 August 1927 – 5 February 2023) was a Chinese Buddhist monk, teacher, and philanthropist based in Taiwan. He was the founder of the Fo Guang Shan Buddhist monastic order as well as the layperson-based Buddha's Light International Association. Hsing Yun was considered a major proponent of Humanistic Buddhism and one of the most influential teachers of modern Taiwanese Buddhism. In Taiwan, he was popularly referred to as one of the "Four Heavenly Kings" of Taiwanese Buddhism, along with his contemporaries: Master Sheng-yen of Dharma Drum Mountain, Master Cheng Yen of Tzu Chi and Master Wei Chueh of Chung Tai Shan.

Biography
Hsing Yun was born Lee Kuo-shen (pinyin: Lǐ Guóshēn)  in 1927 in Jiangdu village (modern day Yangzhou), Kiangsu (Jiangsu) Province in the Republic of China.  Hsing Yun's first exposure to Buddhism came from his grandmother, a practicing Buddhist and meditator. In 1938 he entered the monastic life at the age of 12, ordaining as a novice at Qixia Temple under Zhikai, where he received the novice name Jinjue. He received the  upasampadā vinaya precepts under Ruoshun at the same temple in 1941, receiving the dharma name Wuche.

Shortly after taking the full precepts, Hsing Yun was first inspired by Buddhist modernism in 1945 while studying at Jiaoshan Buddhist College. There he learned about Buddhist teacher Taixu's calls for reform in Buddhism and the Sangha. At a certain point, he adopted the name "Hsing Yun", literally meaning "nebula" in Chinese, to reflect his new philosophy. He fled mainland China to Taiwan in 1949 following the communist victory in the civil war but was arrested along with several other Buddhist monastics. Hsing Yun and the others were released after 23 days, and he then spent the next several years developing a large following and founding numerous temples. In 1966, Hsing Yun bought some land in Kaohsiung and started building a large monastery. After partial completion, the temple opened in 1967 and would later become the headquarters of the Fo Guang Shan Buddhist organization.

Hsing Yun's Fo Guang Shan Buddhist order is a proponent of "Humanistic" Buddhism, and Hsing Yun himself was the abbot of the order until his resignation in 1985. Following his resignation, Hsing Yun founded the Buddha's Light International Association (BLIA) as a layperson based Humanistic Buddhist organization.

Fo Guang Shan eventually grew to become one of the most significant social actors in Taiwan; the organization has established several schools and colleges, and runs orphanages, homes for the elderly, and drug rehabilitation programs in prisons. Fo Guang Shan has also been involved in some international relief efforts.

Fo Guang Shan entered mainland China in the early 21st century, focusing more on charity and Chinese cultural revival rather than Buddhist propagation in order to avoid conflict with the Chinese government, which opposes proselytizing. Fo Guang Shan's presence in China increased under the premiership of General Secretary Xi Jinping after he started a program to revive traditional Chinese faiths. According to Hsing Yun, his goal in mainland China was to work with the mainland government to rebuild China's culture following the destruction of the Cultural Revolution, rather than promote Buddhism in the mainland.

The headquarters of Fo Guang Shan in Kaohsiung is currently the largest Buddhist monastery in Taiwan. On top of that, the order has a network of over 300 branches throughout Taiwan, as well as several branches worldwide in at least fifty countries.

Politics

In Taiwan, Hsing Yun was notable for his activity in political affairs, particularly as a supporter of the One-China policy as well as government legislation supported by the Kuomintang, and was criticized for his views by those in favor of Taiwan independence and by religious figures, as being overtly political and "considerably far afield from traditional monastic concerns". During the 2008 presidential election, Hsing Yun publicly endorsed Kuomintang candidate Ma Ying-jeou. During the second World Buddhist Forum in 2009, Hsing Yun asserted that there are "no Taiwanese" and that Taiwanese "are Chinese". During the 2016 presidential election campaign, Hsing Yun caused considerable comment when he compared DPP candidate Tsai Ing-wen to the Chinese goddess Mazu, commenting that those traits would probably help Tsai be elected president, which she eventually was. To dispel rumors of party switching, Hsing Yun publicly gave his endorsement to KMT candidate Hung Hsiu-chu, who eventually withdrew from the race. Despite his Kuomintang partisanship, Hsing Yun was generally known to be respected by politicians of both parties. 

He encouraged reconciliation between China and the Dalai Lama, but tried hard to avoid causing rifts between him and his organisation and the Chinese government.

Illness and death
On 26 December 2011, Hsing Yun suffered a minor ischemic stroke, his second in that year. In his older years Hsing Yun began suffering from numerous health issues, including diabetes and near blindness.

Hsing Yun died at his residence in Fo Guang Shan monastery on the afternoon of 5 February 2023, after years of unstable health. He was 95 (97 according to East Asian age reckoning), having spent 85 years of his life as a monastic. The announcement of his death was delayed in order for his worldwide branch temples to finish celebrating ceremonies on the Lantern Festival, the last day of the Lunar New Year celebration. Per his wishes, he requested to be returned to Fo Guang Shan where he could die peacefully. He had also requested that no extravagant funeral arrangements be made, eschewing the traditional 49 day mourning period down to seven days.

On the early morning of 6 February, the news of Hsing Yun’s death was announced in the Great Hero Hall by Venerable Hsin Bau. Shortly after the formal announcement, Hsing Yun’s body was placed in a seated position inside a dome-like container in the shape of the Parinirvana Stupa in Kushinagar, India.  His body was placed upon a dais inside the Cloud Dwelling Building where he laid in state for seven days. During this time, monastics, lay followers, and dignitaries paid their respects. 

Hsing Yun’s funeral was held on 13 February, with President Tsai Ing-wen, Premier Chen Chien-jen, KMT chairman Eric Chu, and Kaohsiung mayor Chen Chi-mai in attendance. His remains were cremated at Daxian Temple in nearby Tainan, Baihe District. His urn was returned to Fo Guang Shan’s Longevity Memorial Park the same evening. Several colorful sarira pearls were reported to have been found among Hsing Yun’s remains following his cremation.

Awards
In 2008, Hsing Yun was awarded the honorary Doctor of Humane Letters (L.H.D.) from Whittier College.

On the morning of 13 February 2023, President Tsai Ing-wen conferred a posthumous presidential citation upon Hsing Yun, extolling his many achievements.

Citations

General and cited references 
 Chandler, Stuart (2004). Establishing a Pure Land on Earth: The Foguang Buddhist Perspective on Modernization and Globalization. Honolulu: University of Hawaii Press. 
 Chia, Jack Meng-Tat (2015). "Toward a Modern Buddhist Hagiography Telling the Life of Hsing Yun in Popular Media", Asian Ethnology 74 (1), 141–165
 Kimball, Richard L. (2000). "Humanistic Buddhism as Conceived and Interpreted by Grand Master Hsing Yun of Fo Guang Shan". Hsi Lai Journal of Humanistic Buddhism 1: 1–52.

External links

 The Works of Hsing Yun
 Venerable Master Hsing Yun

1927 births
2023 deaths
Buddhist writers
Chinese religious leaders
Chinese Civil War refugees
Fo Guang Shan Buddhists
People from Yangzhou
Taiwanese religious leaders
Taiwanese people from Jiangsu
Academic staff of Tunghai University